The Third Battle of Tucson was a battle during the Spanish colonization of Sonora, now the present day Arizona in the United States. The battle pitched the Apache warriors against the Spanish cavalry garrison of Tucson.

Battle
On Christmas Day, December 25, 1782, Apache attacked Tucson for a third time, specifically to raid the cattle herds. General Pedro Allande y Saabedra described the attack later:

"More than 200 seized the cattle which were recovered by the parties of troops which he dispatched in their pursuit inasmuch as the wound in his leg was still open. They were able to kill six of the Apache aggressors, whose heads were cut off."

The heads were later placed along the presidio walls, meant to scare off potential threats. Specific Spanish casualties are not known. Apaches would attack again, two years later, to try a capture Spanish livestock again.

See also
History of Tucson, Arizona
Siege of Tubac
American Indian Wars
Apache Wars
Navajo Wars

References
 Bancroft, Hubert Howe, 1888, History of Arizona and New Mexico, 1530–1888. The History Company, San Francisco.
 Cooper, Evelyn S., 1995, Tucson in Focus: The Buehman Studio. Arizona Historical Society, Tucson..
 Dobyns, Henry F., 1976, Spanish Colonial Tucson. University of Arizona Press, Tucson..
 Drachman, Roy P., 1999, From Cowtown to Desert Metropolis: Ninety Years of Arizona Memories. Whitewing Press, San Francisco..

Tucson
Tucson
Tucson
Tucson
Tucson
1782 in New Spain
Tucson 3